= Ed Putnam =

American politician (1928–2008)

Member of the New Hampshire House of Representatives
- In office 1992–1994
- In office 1998–2008

Personal details
- Born: September 5, 1928 Haverhill, Massachusetts, U.S.
- Died: December 2, 2008 (aged 80)
- Party: Republican
- Education: Northeastern University

Ed Putnam (September 5, 1928 – December 2, 2008), also known as Ed M. Putnam II, was an American politician. He served as a Republican member of the New Hampshire House of Representatives.

== Life and career ==
Putnam was born in Haverhill, Massachusetts. He attended Northeastern University.

Putnam served in the New Hampshire House of Representatives from 1992 to 1994 and again from 1998 to 2008.

Putnam died on December 2, 2008, at the age of 80.
